Digital transaction management (DTM) is a category of cloud services designed to digitally manage document-based transactions. DTM removes the friction
inherent in transactions that involve people, documents, and data to create faster, easier, more convenient, and secure processes. DTM goes beyond content and document management to include e-signatures, authentication and non-repudiation; enabling co-browsing between the customer and the business ; document transfer and certification; secure archiving that goes beyond records management; and a variety of meta-processes around managing electronic transactions and the documents associated with them.

DTM standards are proposed and managed by the xDTM Standard Association

Aragon Research has estimated that "by YE 2016, 70% of large enterprises will have a DTM initiative underway or fully implemented."

References

Cloud computing